High School Musical is the soundtrack of the Disney Channel Original Movie of the same name. Recorded in five days, it was released on January 10, 2006, and became the best selling album of that year, having sold more than 3.7 million copies in the US and 7 million copies worldwide.  As of January 2016, the album has sold 5 million copies in the US, making it the best-selling TV soundtrack since 1991 when Nielsen SoundScan started tracking music sales.

Track listing

* Are not on the first disc of the two-disc special edition version.

 ** Drew Seeley sang in several of the songs, his voice being mixed with Zac Efron's. He originally was not given credit for singing.

Two-disc special edition
On May 23, 2006, the same day the DVD was released, Walt Disney Records released a special edition of the High School Musical album featuring a bonus disc with eight karaoke tracks of the High School Musical numbers.

Two-disc collector's edition
For a limited time, Wal-Mart retailer stores only released an exclusive two-disc collector's edition of High School Musical. It included the soundtrack and the bonus DVD. The collector's edition is now available in the Philippines on the same release date of the soundtrack of High School Musical 2 after Universal Music Limited became the newest licensee of Walt Disney Records in the said country. It includes:

Track listing with untitled tracks

There are some untitled tracks.

High School Musical Hits Remixed
High School Musical Hits Remixed was released exclusively to Wal-Mart on December 11, 2007, and features remixes of various songs from the soundtracks to both High School Musical and High School Musical 2.

 "Bet on It" (Remix)
 "Fabulous" (Remix)
 "Breaking Free" (Remix)
 "Bop to the Top" (Remix)
 "I Don't Dance" (Remix)
 "I Can't Take My Eyes Off of You" (Remix)
 "Humuhumunukunukuapua'a" (Remix)
 "We're All in This Together" (Remix)

Chart positions

Weekly charts

Year-end charts

Certifications and sales

International versions
The album has been rerecorded and released in international versions with foreign language lyrics in some countries.

International versions have also been released for individual singles.

Release history

See also
High School Musical
High School Musical 2
High School Musical 3: Senior Year
High School Musical: El desafio (Argentina)

References

External links
 
 High School Musical Soundtrack Online Resource
 
 
 Jaheim's 'Classics' Crash In At No. 1

Albums produced by Matthew Gerrard
Disney film soundtracks
2000s film soundtrack albums
High School Musical albums
2006 soundtrack albums
Walt Disney Records soundtracks
Cast recordings
Television soundtracks
Various artists albums